The canton of La Ferté-Bernard is an administrative division of the Sarthe department, northwestern France. Its borders were modified at the French canton reorganisation which came into effect in March 2015. Its seat is in La Ferté-Bernard.

It consists of the following communes:
 
Avezé
Beillé
Boëssé-le-Sec
La Bosse
Bouër
La Chapelle-du-Bois
La Chapelle-Saint-Rémy
Cherré-Au
Cormes
Dehault
Duneau
La Ferté-Bernard
Le Luart
Préval
Prévelles
Saint-Aubin-des-Coudrais
Saint-Denis-des-Coudrais
Saint-Martin-des-Monts
Sceaux-sur-Huisne
Souvigné-sur-Même
Théligny
Tuffé-Val-de-la-Chéronne
Villaines-la-Gonais
Vouvray-sur-Huisne

References

Cantons of Sarthe